Pius Segmüller (born  8 March 1952) is a Swiss politician and former commander of the Swiss Guard in the Vatican City (1998-2002).

Segmüller was appointed Commander of the Swiss Guard following the death of Alois Estermann. In 2002, he was succeeded by Elmar Mäder and became head of the police of the city of Lucerne (2002-2006).

In October 2007, Segmüller was elected to the Swiss National Council as a member of the Christian Democratic People's Party (CVP/PDC) from the Canton of Lucerne. In 2011 Swiss federal election he was not re-elected.

He is currently Director of Security for the International Federation of Association Football (FIFA).

External links

1952 births
Swiss Roman Catholics
Members of the National Council (Switzerland)
Christian Democratic People's Party of Switzerland politicians
Living people
Commanders of the Swiss Guard